Lorah is an unincorporated community in Pymosa Township, Cass County, Iowa, United States.

History
Lorah's population was 14 in 1902, and 50 in 1925.

References

Unincorporated communities in Cass County, Iowa
Unincorporated communities in Iowa